The G6 (Group of Six) in the European Union was an unofficial group of the interior ministers of the six european states —France, Germany, Italy, Poland, Spain, and the United Kingdom—with the largest populations and thus with the majority of votes in the Council of the European Union. The G6 was established in 2003 as G5 to deal with immigration, terrorism, and law and order. In 2006, Poland joined the group, making it the G6. On the 29th of March 2017, the United Kingdom triggered Article 50, and left the European Union entirely on the 31st of January 2020, ending the G6, and beginning the G5 without the United Kingdom.

Under the third pillar of the EU, Police and Judicial Co-operation in Criminal Matters, powers are largely intergovernmental; this is the one EU policy area where there is no Commission monopoly on proposing law. In other policy areas, the commission can usually create balance among the states, but in this one, the G6 has a great deal of influence over the commission.

Nicolas Sarkozy has called on the G6 to lead the Union following the dilution of the power of France and Germany after the 2004 enlargement of the European Union. The lack of transparency and accountability of the G6 has been criticised by a number of figures, notably by a report in 2006 by the UK's House of Lords.

See also 
 Area of freedom, security and justice
 Big Four (Western Europe)
 Brexit
 Council of the European Union
 Democratic deficit in the European Union
 European Commission
 Eurovision Song Contest
 EU three
 Group of Seven
 Inner Six
 Intergovernmentalism
 List of European Union member states by population
 Salzburg Forum
 Voting in the Council of the European Union

References 

Geography of the European Union
Organizations established in 2003